Magdalena Decilio (born 23 March 1983) is a team handball player from Argentina. She defends Argentina, such as at the 2011 World Women's Handball Championship in Brazil and the 2013 World Women's Handball Championship in Serbia.

References

1983 births
Living people
Argentine female handball players
Place of birth missing (living people)
Handball players at the 2003 Pan American Games
Handball players at the 2007 Pan American Games
Handball players at the 2011 Pan American Games
Pan American Games medalists in handball
Pan American Games silver medalists for Argentina
Pan American Games bronze medalists for Argentina
Medalists at the 2007 Pan American Games
Medalists at the 2011 Pan American Games
20th-century Argentine women
21st-century Argentine women